Orgyia leuschneri, the box-elder tussock moth, is a species of tussock moth in the family Erebidae. It is found in North America.

The MONA or Hodges number for Orgyia leuschneri is 8315.

References

Further reading

 
 
 

Lymantriinae
Articles created by Qbugbot
Moths described in 1972